Morten Steenstrup  (born 4 April 1953) is a Norwegian barrister and politician.

He was born in Tønsberg to Petter Chr. Steenstrup and Kari Bertnes. He was elected representative to the Storting for the period 1981–1985 for the Conservative Party, and reelected for the period 1985–1989.

On 1 December 2021, he was designated as the new leader of the Oslo Conservatives after Heidi Nordby Lunde announced in October that she wouldn’t be seeking re-election.

References

1953 births
Living people
Politicians from Tønsberg
Conservative Party (Norway) politicians
Members of the Storting